Miguel Alberto Flangini Ximénez (1824–1900) was a Uruguayan political figure.

Background

Flangini was a member of the Colorado Party (Uruguay). This was during an era which was marked by considerable turmoil within the party.

Interim President of Uruguay

He served briefly as President of Uruguay 28 February – 1 March 1882.

Death

He died in 1900.

References

See also

 Colorado Party (Uruguay)#Earlier History
 Politics of Uruguay

1824 births
1900 deaths
Presidents of Uruguay
Colorado Party (Uruguay) politicians
19th-century Uruguayan people